Thin-shell structures are lightweight constructions using shell elements.

Notable projects

Asia/Pacific
 Nagoya Dome, Nagoya, Japan
 Parish of the Holy Sacrifice at the University of the Philippines Diliman, Quezon City, Philippines
 Putrajaya Convention Centre, Putrajaya, Malaysia
 Sydney Opera House, Sydney, Australia
 Tokyo Dome, Tokyo, Japan
 Tower Infinity, Seoul, South Korea

Europe
 Adziogol Lighthouse, Kherson Oblast, Ukraine
 Aquatoll, Neckarsulm, Germany
 Berlin Main Station, Berlin, Germany
 Dortmund Opera House, Dortmund, Germany
 Dos Hermanas Velodrome, Dos Hermanas, Spain
 Eden Project, Cornwall, England
 Europe 1 Transmitter Building, Felsberg-Berus, Germany
 Haus der Kulturen der Welt, Berlin, Germany
 Imperial War Museum, Duxford, England
 Parabolic steel-and-glass roof of the Kiyevsky railway station, Moscow, Russia
 Korkeasaari Lookout Tower, Helsinki, Finland
 L'Oceanogràfic at the City of Arts and Sciences, Valencia, Spain
 Lotus Sculpture at the Goodwood Festival of Speed, UK
 Milan Trade Fair, Milan, Italy
 Palau Guell, Barcelona, Spain
 Philips Pavilion at the Expo '58, Brussels, Belgium
 Pylons of Cadiz, Cadiz, Spain
 Queen Elizabeth II Great Court of the British Museum, London, England
 Sagrada Familia, Barcelona, Spain
 Shukhov's Rotunda at the All-Russia exhibition, Nizhny Novgorod, Russia
 Shukhov Tower, Moscow, Russia
 Stanislav Range Front Light, Kherson Oblast, Ukraine
 Swiss Air Force Museum, Zurich, Switzerland
 Weald and Downland Gridshell at the Weald and Downland Open Air Museum, Chichester, England
 Zeiss-Planetarium, Jena, Germany

North America
 Centre Pierre Charbonneau, Montreal, Canada
 Dorton Arena, Raleigh, North Carolina, US
 Ingalls Rink at Yale University, Connecticut, US
 Kresge Auditorium, Massachusetts, US
 Lambert-St. Louis International Airport, Missouri, US
 McDonnell Planetarium at the St. Louis Science Center, Missouri, US
 Montreal Biosphère, Montreal, Canada
 Payson Athletic Center, Arizona, US
 Scotiabank Saddledome, Calgary, Canada
 Spaceship Earth at Disney World, Florida, US
 TWA Flight Center of John F. Kennedy International Airport, New York, US
 Washington Dulles International Airport, Virginia, US

External links

Thin-shell structures at Structurae
Double thin-shells structures at Structurae

Thin-shell structures
Lists of buildings and structures